Hayden National Forest was established by the U.S. Forest Service in Colorado and Wyoming on July 1, 1908, with , mostly in Wyoming from Sierra Madre National Forest and part of Park Range National Forest.  On August 2, 1929, the entire forest was divided between Medicine Bow National Forest and Routt National Forest and the name was discontinued.

References

External links
Forest History Society
Forest History Society:Listing of the National Forests of the United States Text from Davis, Richard C., ed. Encyclopedia of American Forest and Conservation History. New York: Macmillan Publishing Company for the Forest History Society, 1983. Vol. II, pp. 743-788.

Former National Forests of Colorado
Former National Forests of Wyoming